Dinis is a Portuguese surname. Notable people with the surname include:

 Alfredo Dinis (1917–1945), Portuguese anti-fascist
 Edmund Dinis (1924–2010), American politician
 Fernando Dinis (born 1982), Portuguese footballer
 Henrique Dinis (born 1990), Portuguese footballer
 João Manuel Dinis (born 1979), Portuguese footballer
 Joaquim Dinis (born 1947), Portuguese footballer
 Júlio Dinis (1839–1871), Portuguese doctor

Portuguese-language surnames